Mankato East High School is a four-year public high school in Mankato, Minnesota, United States. The present school opened in 1973.

Athletics
The Mankato East Cougars are part of the Big 9 Conference.

Notable alumni
Greg Orman - American businessman and politician
Craig Dahl - an NFL football player, son of Terry Dahl. He earned a Championship Ring in Super Bowl XLII while playing with the New York Giants.

References

External links
 

Public high schools in Minnesota
Educational institutions established in 1973
Schools in Blue Earth County, Minnesota
Mankato, Minnesota
1973 establishments in Minnesota